The Laws in Wales Acts 1535 and 1542 were Acts of the Parliament of England, causing Wales to be annexed to the Kingdom of England. English law and the English language were imposed upon the Welsh people and the norms of English administration were introduced to create a single state and legal jurisdiction. The Acts were passed during the reign of King Henry VIII of England, of the  Tudor dynasty, and are sometimes referred to as the Acts of Union.

Before these Acts, Wales was excluded from Parliamentary representation and divided between the Principality of Wales and many feudal statelets called the marcher Lordships.

The Act declared King Henry's intentions, that because of differences in law and language:

– and therefore:

Names and dates
They are sometimes misleadingly known as the Acts of Union, but the legal short title of each Act has since 1948 been "The Laws in Wales Act". They are also often seen cited by the years they received royal assent, 1536 and 1543 respectively, although the official citation uses the preceding years, as each of these Acts this date was passed between 1 January and 25 March, at a time when New Year's Day fell on 25 March.

Background
From the conquest of Gwynedd in 1282–83 until the passing of the Laws in Wales Acts, the administrative system of Wales had remained unchanged. By the Statute of Rhuddlan in 1284 the territory of the native Welsh rulers had been broken up into the five counties of Anglesey, Caernarfon, Cardigan, Carmarthen, and Merioneth. Even though the five counties were subject to English criminal law, the "Principality" was the king of England's own personal fief and Welsh law continued to be used for civil cases. The rest of Wales, except for the county of Flint, which was part of the Principality, and the Royal lordships of Glamorgan and Pembroke, was made up of numerous small lordships, each with its own courts, laws and other customs.

When Henry Tudor, Earl of Richmond (descended from an Anglesey landowning family) seized the English throne in 1485, becoming Henry VII, no change was made to the system of governing Wales, though he remained concerned about the power of the Marcher Lords and the lawlessness and disorder in the Welsh Marches. To deal with this there was a revival of the Council of Wales and the Marches, which had been established in the reign of Edward IV. After the deaths of many of the Marcher lords during the Wars of the Roses, many of the lordships had passed into the hands of the crown.

Henry VIII did not see the need to reform the government of Wales at the beginning of his reign, but gradually he perceived a threat from some of the remaining Marcher lords and therefore instructed his chief minister, Thomas Cromwell, to seek a solution. His solution was the annexation or incorporation of Wales which, along with other significant changes at the same time, led to the creation of England as a modern sovereign state.

The Acts have been known as the "Acts of Union", but they were not popularly referred to as such until 1901, when historian Owen M. Edwards assigned them that name—a name some historians such as S. B. Chrimes regard as misleading, as the Acts were concerned with harmonising laws, not political union.

The Acts
The Act of 1535 was passed in 1536 in the 8th session of Henry VIII's 5th Parliament, which began on 4 February 1535/6, and repealed with effect from 21 December 1993. Meanwhile the Act of 1542 was passed in 1543 in the 2nd session of Henry VIII's 8th Parliament, which began on 22 January 1542/3, and repealed with effect from 3 January 1995.

The first of these Acts was passed by a Parliament that had no representatives from Wales. Its effect was to extend English law into the Marches and provide that Wales had representation in future Parliaments. The Acts were given their short titles by the Statute Law Revision Act 1948.

Provisions 
The Act of 1535 imposed English law and the English language upon the Welsh people and allowed Welsh representation in the English parliament. These Acts also had many effects on the administration of Wales. The marcher lordships were abolished as political units, and five new counties were established on Welsh lands (Monmouthshire, Brecknockshire, Radnorshire, Montgomeryshire and Denbighshire), thus creating a Wales of 13 counties; Other areas of the lordships were annexed to Shropshire, Herefordshire, Gloucestershire, Glamorgan, Carmarthenshire, Pembrokeshire, Cardiganshire and Merionethshire; The borders of Wales for administrative/government purposes were established and have remained the same since; this was unintentional as Wales was to be incorporated fully into England, but the status of Monmouthshire was still ambiguous in the view of some people until confirmed by the Local Government Act 1972.

For ecclesiastical (i.e. Church of England) purposes, several areas of England were parts of Welsh dioceses until disestablishment of the Church in Wales in 1920: the area around Oswestry, Shropshire — part of St Asaph diocese — was the largest. (In 1920, those parishes wholly within England were transferred to English dioceses, though parishes partly in England and partly in Wales were allowed to elect either to remain in the Church of England or to join the newly disestablished Church in Wales: 17 out of 18 voted to stay with the Church of England so there is a little area of England in the Church in Wales diocese of St Asaph, and larger areas of Wales still within Church of England dioceses.)

Wales elected members to the English (Westminster) Parliament, and the Council of Wales and the Marches was established on a legal basis. The Court of Great Sessions was established, a system peculiar to Wales, with a Sheriff appointed in every county, and other county officers as in England. The courts of the marcher lordships lost the power to try serious criminal cases, all courts in Wales were to be conducted in the English language, not Welsh, and the office of Justice of the Peace was introduced, nine to every county.

Each county or shire consisted of fewer than a dozen hundreds corresponding with varying degrees of accuracy to the former commotes.

Legacy 
These measures were popular with the Welsh gentry in particular, who recognised that they would give them equality under law with English citizens.

Despite historians such as G. R. Elton, who treated the Acts as merely a triumph of Tudor efficiency, modern British, and particularly Welsh, historians are more likely to investigate evidence of the damaging effects of the Acts on Welsh identity, culture, and economy. While the Welsh gentry embraced the Acts and quickly attempted to merge themselves into English aristocracy, the majority of the population could have found themselves adrift amid a legal and economic system whose language and focus were unfamiliar to them.

The Welsh language 
An example of the effects on the Welsh language is the first section of the 1535 Act, which states: 

The same section then goes on to say that:

Section 17 of the 1535 Act made English the only language of the law courts and said that those who used Welsh would not be appointed to, or paid for, any public office in Wales unless they used English when carrying out their work:

This language clause laid the foundation for a thoroughly anglicised ruling class of landed gentry in Wales, which would have many consequences.

All remaining parts of the 1535 Act including those relating to language were definitively repealed in 1993, by the Welsh Language Act 1993, that sections 18–21 were repealed by the Statute Law Revision Act 1887.  Most of the remaining parts of the 1542 Act were also repealed by the Welsh Language Act 1993, with the final remaining section 47 of the 1542 Act about market overt repealed by the Sale of Goods (Amendment) Act 1994.

References

Citations

Notes

Bibliography
 
 
 
 Williams, W. Ogwen (1971), "The union of England and Wales". In A. J. Roderick (Ed.), Wales through the ages: volume II, Modern Wales, from 1485 to the beginning of the 20th century, pp. 16–23. Llandybïe : Christopher Davies (Publishers) Ltd. .

External links
   (Full text of the Acts as passed, from Google Books scan)
 27 Henry VIII c.26 An Act for Laws and Justice to be ministered in Wales in like Form as it is in this Realm
 34 & 35 Henry VIII c.26 An Act for certain Ordinances in the King's Majesty's Dominion and Principality of Wales
 Digital Reproduction of the Original 1535 Act on the Parliamentary Archives catalogue
 Digital Reproduction of the Original 1542 Act on the Parliamentary Archives catalogue

Constitutional laws of Wales
Legal history of Wales
Acts of the Parliament of England (1485–1603)
Annexation
16th century in Wales
1535 in law
1542 in law
1535 in England
1542 in England
1543 in law
1543 in England
1535 in Wales
1542 in Wales
1543 in Wales
Repealed English legislation
England–Wales relations
Church in Wales
Principality of Wales